Xylophanes blanca is a moth of the  family Sphingidae. It is known from Peru.

The wingspan is 62–70 mm for males and about 71 mm for females. It is similar to Xylophanes rothschildi, but the oval patch distal to the discal spot is smaller and darker green and the postmedian line is narrower.

References

blanca
Moths described in 2001
Endemic fauna of Peru
Moths of South America